Prymnesiovirus is a genus of viruses, in the family Phycodnaviridae. Alga serve as natural hosts. There is only one species in this genus: Chrysochromulina brevifilum virus PW1 (CbV-PW1). It infects Haptolina brevifila, basionym: Chrysochromulina brevifilum (Edvardsen et al., 2011).

Structure

Viruses in Prymnesiovirus are enveloped, with icosahedral and round geometries, and T=169 symmetry. The diameter is around 100-170 nm. Genomes are linear, around 120-485kb in length.

Life cycle
Viral replication is nucleo-cytoplasmic. Replication follows the DNA strand displacement model. DNA-templated transcription is the method of transcription. The virus exits the host cell by lysis via lytic phospholipids. Alga serve as the natural host. Transmission routes are passive diffusion.

References

External links
 Viralzone: Prymnesiovirus
 ICTV

Phycodnaviridae
Virus genera